Breakwater is the debut album by Lennie Gallant, released in 1988 (see 1988 in music).

Track listing
 "Tales of the Phantom Ship", a song inspired by the Ghost Ship of Northumberland Strait. 
 "Island Clay"
 "Raise the Dead of Wintertime"
 "Back to Rustico"
 "From a Distance"
 "Marie and He"
 "The Hope for Next Year"
 "Breakwater"
 "Big City"
 "The Reconcillation Two-Step"
 "La Tempete"
 "Down on the Promenade"
 "Destination"

All songs by Lennie Gallant except "Raise the Dead of Wintertime" by Allan Rankin.

Personnel
Musicians side A
Lennie Gallant - guitar, vocals, harmonica, tin whistle, mandolin.
Janet Munson -violin.
Kevin Roach - mandolin, mandocello and dobro.
Danny Parker - electric and acoustic bass.
Jim Hillman - drums.
Greg Simm - bass (track 6).
Chris Corrigan - electric guitar (track 6).
Michel Dupire - percussion (track 5).
Michael Hinton - accordian [sic] (track 2).
Teresa Doyle, Suzanne Lamontagne - backup vocals.
Musicians side B
Chris Corrigan - electric guitar.
Bruce Dixon - bass.
Janet Munson - violin.
Steve Naylor - keyboards.
Tom Roach - drums.
Cathy Grant - backup vocals.
Suzanne Lamontagne - backup vocals (track 6).
This list is incomplete

1988 debut albums
Lennie Gallant albums
Revenant Records albums